Screaming Masterpiece (Gargandi snilld in Icelandic) is a 2005 documentary film directed and written by Ari Alexander Ergis Magnússon about the music scene in Iceland. It attempts to explore the reasons why Iceland has such a rich variety of musical talent.

The film itself shows mostly live performances and interviews by some of Iceland's biggest musicians, including Björk, Sigur Rós, Slowblow, múm, Ghostigital, Quarashi, Singapore Sling amongst others, over the backdrop of Icelandic scenery. It contains also interview clips with the musician and goði Hilmar Örn Hilmarsson of the Íslenska Ásatrúarfélagið, the official Ásatrú religious organization of Iceland.

See also

 Rokk í Reykjavík (1982) an earlier documentary on Iceland's music scene.

References

External links

 
 Screaming Masterpiece Trailer and Official Website

2005 films
2000s Icelandic-language films
Icelandic music
2005 documentary films
Icelandic documentary films